The Church of St. Johns, St. John the Baptist and St. John the Apostle and Evangelist is located at the Old Town of Vilnius, Lithuania and dominates the university (Vilnius University) ensemble.  Since the times of the Jesuit Academy professors and students used to pray here, and Vilnius theologians gave sermons. It was a place for performances and disputes, where theses were defended and kings greeted.

History

The church was built in 1388–1426, reconstructed in the 16th and 17th centuries. The tower, separate from the church itself, was built in the 16th century. After the fire in 1737, from 1738 to 1748, architect Johann Christoph Glaubitz completely reconstructed the church in style of late Baroque. During the 1827-28 reconstruction, architect Karol Podczaszynski destroyed the bulk of the sumptuous Baroque interior - nearly 3000 carts with splinters of altars, sculptures and stucco works were taken to a dump; chapels suffered the least. In the Soviet times the church was closed down and severely damaged. During Hitler's occupation, the Reverend Alfonsas Lipniūnas, who was later imprisoned by the Nazis in the Stutthof camp and perished, delivered rebellious sermons in the church. In 1979 a university museum was founded there. In 1991 the church was returned to its parishioners. On his visit to Lithuania in 1993, Pope John Paul II held a meeting with intellectuals here. The church is dedicated to both St John the Baptist and St John the Evangelist.

Architecture

The layout of the Church of St. Johns still reflects its original Gothic structure. It is a  hall church with three naves and seven asymmetrical chapels. The tower, consisting of 5 gradually decreasing portions, is the tallest building of Vilnius Old Town. The central focus of the church interior is a composition of 10 presbytery altars, unique in Lithuania and the Baltic countries (before Pdczaszynski's demolition work there were as many as 22 altars in the presbytery and naves). The altars are positioned in a semi-circle, on varying planes and levels, and light illuminates them through the Gothic presbytery windows. They are abundantly decorated with paintings and sculptures. The organ of the Church of St. Johns was the most famous one in Lithuania, but in the Soviet period it was destroyed; it has now been restored. 
In the central nave at the pillars stand 18 sculptures, 12 of which represent various saints bearing the name of John. All frescoes in the church date from the 18th century and were uncovered and restored in the 1970s. The church contains many memorial monuments: to Konstantinas Sirvydas (sculpt. Juozas Kėdainis, 1979), Adam Mickiewicz (sculpt. Piotr Stryjenski and Marceli Gujski, 1899), Simonas Daukantas (sculpt. Gediminas Jokūbonis, 1979) and others.

Gallery

See also
 List of Jesuit sites

References

Roman Catholic churches in Vilnius
Baroque church buildings in Lithuania
Roman Catholic churches in Lithuania
Rebuilt buildings and structures in Lithuania